David S. Adams (born 1961) was the Assistant Secretary of State for Legislative Affairs of the United States Department of State.  He was appointed to this position in August 2011.  Previously he was Deputy Assistant Secretary of State for House Affairs.  Before this he served for 24 years on the staff of Gary L. Ackerman a member of the United States House.  

Adams has a BA from the University of Connecticut, an MA from American University and an MBA from Loyola University Maryland.

References

Citations

Sources 

 United States Government bio of Adams

1961 births
Living people
University of Connecticut alumni
American University alumni
Loyola University Maryland alumni
United States Assistant Secretaries of State